The 2017–18 First League of the Federation of Bosnia and Herzegovina was the twenty-third season of the First League of the Federation of Bosnia and Herzegovina, the second tier football league of Bosnia and Herzegovina, since its original establishment and the eighteenth as a unified federation-wide league. It began on 5 August 2017 and ended on 2 June 2018.  GOŠK Gabela were the last champions, having won their second championship title in the 2016–17 season and earning a promotion to Premier League of Bosnia and Herzegovina.

Teams

League table

Results

Statistics

Top goalscorers

See also
2017–18 Premier League of Bosnia and Herzegovina
2017–18 First League of the Republika Srpska
2017–18 Bosnia and Herzegovina Football Cup

References

External links
Official site for the Football Federation of Bosnia and Herzegovina
Official site for the Football Federation of the Federation of Bosnia and Herzegovina
2017–18 First League of the Federation of Bosnia and Herzegovina at Soccerway

First
Bos
First League of the Federation of Bosnia and Herzegovina seasons